Chad competed at the 2015 African Games held in Brazzaville, Republic of the Congo.

Medal summary

Medal table

Judo 

Three judoka represented Chad at the 2015 African Games.

Wrestling 

Chad won two medals in wrestling. Dieudonne Basil won a bronze medal in both the men's freestyle 97 kg event and in the men's Greco-Roman 98 kg event.

References 

Nations at the 2015 African Games
2015
African Games